Aravindan is both a surname and a given name. Notable people with the name include:

G. Aravindan (1935–1991), Indian film director, screenwriter, musician, cartoonist, and painter
Aravindan Neelakandan (born 1971), Indian writer
Mala Aravindan (1939–2015), Malayalam film actor